Ali Muhammad Rashidi ( August 5, 1905–March 14, 1987) was a Pakistani politician, scholar, bureaucrat, journalist, and writer. He was from Rashidi Syed and the elder brother of scholar Hassam-ud-Din Rashidi.

Early life 
Rashidi's father Muhammad Hamid Shah lived in Bahman village, Ratodero Taluka, Larkana District, Sindh. Rashidi got his early education from Muhammad Soomar and Muhammad Sidiq. He taught himself Persian, Urdu and English. He also studied English with Marmaduke Pickthall.

Career

Rashidi started his career as a journalist for the Sindh News newspaper in 1924. He was appointed as the secretary of Mohammad Ayub Khuhro in 1927. He was appointed editor of Al Rashid in 1928 at Sukkur. He served as editor of Al Amin. He started the newspaper Sitar-e-Sindh in 1934. In 1948, he became the editor of the English-language newspaper Sindh Observer. He served as the president of the Pakistan Newspapers Editors Association.

Politics

Rashidi started his political career in 1926 by joining the Sindh Muhammadan Association where he fought for the election of Sindh in Bombay. In 1934 he joined the Peoples Party of Sir Shahnawaz Bhutto. He joined the Muslim League in 1938 where he supported the Pakistani cause for independence by holding the positions of Secretary of the Sindh Provincial Muslim League and Secretary of the Foreign Committee. According to the late Yusuf Abdullah Haroon (an elder statesman of Pakistan), Rashidi was involved in the drafting of the Pakistan Resolution of 1940, also known as the Lahore Resolution. After 1947, he was instrumental in reinstating the Gaddi of Pir Pagara while ignoring the Frontier Regulation. He was elected MPA in the Sindh Assembly in the election of 1953, thereafter appointed Minister of Revenue. In the era of Mohammad Ayub Khuhro, he served as the Minister of Health, Revenue and Information. He also served as the Federal Minister for Information under Prime Minister Chaudhry Muhammad Ali.

Diplomat and author

He served as Pakistan's ambassador to the Philippines from 1957 to 1961. He also served as the Ambassador to China for 10 months, during which he concluded negotiations for a border agreement between Pakistan and China that Zulfiqar Ali Bhutto later signed on behalf of Pakistan. His work and journalism also took him to Hong Kong.

Rashidi wrote books in Sindhi, Urdu and English on politics, biographies, local issues and diaries.

Selected publications

 Uhee Denhin Uhee Shenih (3 volumes)
 Jager Dari Jo Khatimo
 Sindh jee Nain Wizarat
 Boodin Ja Imdadi Masla
 Cheen jee (diary)
 Imam Inqlaab
 Sindh Ways and Days

See also
 Hassam-ud-Din Rashidi
 Nabi Bux Khan Baloch
 Dr. Umar Bin Muhammad Daudpota
 Mirza Qalich Baig
 Allama I. I. Kazi
 Elsa Kazi
 Muhammad Ibrahim Joyo
 Ratodero
 Larkana
 Sindhi literature

References

 Janab guzaryum jin sein By G. M. Syed
 Maro jee Malir Ja By Khadim Hussain Chandio

1905 births
1987 deaths
Pakistani Muslims
People from Larkana District
English-language writers from Pakistan
Writers from Karachi
Journalists from Karachi
Pakistani newspaper editors
Ambassadors of Pakistan to China
Ambassadors of Pakistan to the Philippines
All India Muslim League members
Pakistan Movement activists from Sindh
Scholars from Sindh
Pakistani scholars